Ken Kalfus (born April 9, 1954 in New York City) is an American author and journalist. Three of his books have been named New York Times Notable Books of the Year.

Early life and education
He was born in the Bronx, and grew up in Plainview, Long Island.

Kalfus started college at Sarah Lawrence College, Bronxville, but dropped out after the first year. Kalfus later attended the New School for Social Research in Manhattan and New York University. Kalfus started writing at an early age.

Career
Kalfus and his family have lived in Paris, Dublin, Belgrade, and Moscow. He believes his time in other countries keeps his observations fresh and provides him with valuable insights.

Kalfus began his career by publishing short stories and now writes novels. His most recent novel was Equilateral (2013).  His previous novel, A Disorder Peculiar to the Country (2006), was a National Book Award nominee. His first novel was The Commissariat of Enlightenment (2003), preceded by short story collections PU-239 and Other Russian Fantasies (1999) and Thirst (1998).  The latter three works were each chosen among The New York Times Notable Books of the Year.  He published his first book at the age of 44, and achieved favorable critical response.

His story collection Coup de Foudre was published in 2015. The title story is a novella, a thinly veiled fictionalization of Dominique Strauss-Kahn's alleged 2011 sexual assault on a maid in a midtown New York hotel suite.  In an interview in Bookslut, he told the critic Vladislav Davidzon "The news often feeds my imagination, which is why my fiction sometimes plays off topical or historical events...."

The 2007 HBO movie Pu-239 was based on his short story of the same name.

Marriage and family
He is married to Inga Saffron, Pulitzer-winning architecture critic for The Philadelphia Inquirer, with whom he has a daughter, Sky.

Honors
 Finalist for PEN/Faulkner Award
 Salon Book Award
 Pushcart Prize
2009 Guggenheim Fellowship
2009 Pew Fellowships in the Arts

References

External links 
 Three Stories, Madras Press, 2010
 Excerpt, Ken Kalfus, "Thirst", Milkweed Editions, 1998
 "Meet the Writers: Ken Kalfus", Barnes and Noble

1954 births
American male journalists
21st-century American novelists
Living people
Writers from the Bronx
Pew Fellows in the Arts
American male novelists
20th-century American novelists
Journalists from New York City
20th-century American journalists
PEN/Faulkner Award for Fiction winners
20th-century American male writers
21st-century American male writers
Novelists from New York (state)
21st-century American non-fiction writers